Lucas Lazo (born January 31, 1989 in Rosario, Argentina) is an Argentine Association football Midfielder currently playing for Central Córdoba Santiago del Estero, on loan from Rosario Central of the Argentine Primera División.

Teams
  Rosario Central 2010-
  → Central Córdoba (loan) 2011-2012
  → Central Córdoba (SdE) (loan) 2015-

Personal life
He is the brother of the O'Higgins's player Ezequiel Lazo.

External links
 

1989 births
Living people
Argentine footballers
Argentine expatriate footballers
Rosario Central footballers
Association football midfielders
Footballers from Rosario, Santa Fe